Alladand Dheri is a village which consists of two union councils Alladand and Dheri  respectively in the Swat Ranizai Tehsil of Malakand District of PakistanAlladand Dheri is situated in the mid of Malakand and is one of the well known towns in Pashtun lands, known for its history, natural environment and hospitality. It is considered the oldest home of Yousufzai Tribe when they migrated from Afghanistan and settled in Alladand Dheri. The chief of Yousufzai tribe and founder of free Pakhtunkhwa state, Malak Ahmad baba made it capital of the new state. The Pashtun leader Malak Ahmad baba is buried in  Alladand Dheri.  People of Alladand Dheri are entirely Pashtun and are from Alikhel subtribe of Yousufzai tribe.  The land of this town is fertile and is irrigated by River Swat. It shares a major part of supply of fruits and vegetables from Malakand District to whole Pakistan.

References 

Populated places in Malakand District